The Half Way to Hell Club was an exclusive club organized by the men who fell from the Golden Gate Bridge during its construction in 1936 and 1937 and were saved by the safety nets. One of the club's earliest members was Iron Worker Al Zampa who fell into the safety nets in October 1936.

Al Zampa (1905–2000), as one of the club's first members and presumably the last surviving member, became the unofficial spokesman for the club.  According to Zampa, when a man fell to his death from a bridge it was said "he's gone to hell."  The men who fell and were saved by the nets were said to have fallen only "half way to hell." 

Zampa goes on: "There were ten of us that fell into the nets those first few weeks. Four got hurt. I was one of them. We were in the hospital together. We formed the club right there in St. Luke's Hospital." 

Newspaper accounts sketch out some details and give some of the names of the 19 members who rounded out the club. No complete list of names has been found, and only one photo is known to exist from that time of the early group.

Photographer and bridge historian John V. Robinson listed ten of the nineteen members of the Half Way to Hell club in his 2004 book Spanning the Strait as: 
Miles Green
Paul Terry
James Roberts
Jack Miller
Jack Dayle
Edward Stanley
Ward Chamberlain
George Murray
John Perry
Al Zampa

Robinson writes in his book that no one is really sure what became of the 19 men who fell into the nets. No complete list of names has ever been discovered. Al Zampa, who lived to age 95, may have been the last surviving member of the club, and it is very unlikely that any members are still alive.

References

External links
 AlZampaBridge.com Official site of the Alfred Zampa Memorial Bridge
  Link to Zampa book
 . Golden Gate Bridge construction facts
1930s in California
Golden Gate Bridge, Highway and Transportation District